SM40 is a Polish code-name for a Hungarian shunting and maneuvering purpose diesel electric locomotive after export from Hungary to Poland and in service at PKP.

History
SM40 were imported for the first time from Hungary in 1959, after tests at the distance of 2,185 km with cargo load of 156 t.

The first name for this loco was Lwe58, and in 1960 it was changed to SM40 (according to RN-58/MK0001 regulations).

Items delivered from 1961 had a few modifications, and a different code-name SM41.

See also
Polish locomotives designation

Sources

SM40/41

Bo′Bo′ locomotives
Diesel-electric locomotives of Poland
Railway locomotives introduced in 1956
Standard gauge locomotives of Poland